Michael Powell (1905–1990) was a British film director.

Mike Powell (long jumper) (born 1963) is a U.S. athlete, the world record holder in the long jump.

Michael Powell and/or Mike Powell may also refer to:

Sportsmen
 Mike Powell (rugby union) (born 1978), rugby union player for the Ospreys
 Michael Powell (lacrosse) (born 1982), U.S. professional lacrosse player
 Mike Powell (cricketer, born 1975), English cricketer
 Mike Powell (cricketer, born 1977), Welsh cricketer

Others
 Michael Powell (Louisiana politician), American politician from Louisiana
 Michael Powell (Massachusetts politician), a colonial Massachusetts politician
 Mike Powell (radio executive), early UK advocate of radio automation 
 Michael Powell (lobbyist) (born 1963), attorney, former chairman of the U.S. Federal Communications Commission, son of Colin Powell
 Michael Powell (bookseller), owner of a well-known U.S. bookstore
 Michael J. Powell, American R&B musician
 Michael J. D. Powell (1936–2015), British applied mathematician 
 Michael Warren Powell, theatre artistic director, director, actor and designer